Iso Omena (Finnish for "Big Apple") is a shopping centre in Matinkylä, Espoo, Finland, opened on September 24, 2001. The construction of Iso Omena aimed to, as far as possible, take heed of the wishes of the population of Espoo. Because of this, Iso Omena includes many centralised municipal and private services. Iso Omena also includes apartments, with a direct connection to the shopping centre. The name "Iso Omena" comes from the nickname "The Big Apple" of New York City in the United States.

Iso Omena includes over 200 businesses. The building has three floors, a parking lot on the bottom floor and a separate parking building and an office tower.

Information

It opened September 24, 2001. It is owned by Doughty Hanson & Co Real Estate Fund. The architect was Mauri Tommila. Its motto is "Like a small city".

It houses over 200 businesses. It has four floors: Parking lot floor P, Market floor M, Forum floor T and Service floor S. It provides approximately 1,100 jobs.

It has sales of approximately 260 million Euro per year and approximately 12 million visitors per year.

Largest businesses
 K-Citymarket: 
 Prisma: 
 Kirjasto Omena: 
 Aleksi 13: 
 Stadium: 
 HOK, restaurants:

Area

Parking
It has approximately 2,200 free parking spaces in total, divided into Parking lot floor P1 (1,061), Parking lot floor P2 (818), Outside on the market floor P3 (136), Outside on the roof P2 (172), Totaling : 2,187

Services

Services offered include: library, Espoo city common service centre, ticket service and medical and dental health service, chapel, KELA, office of the Finnish employment bureau, and a movie theatre.

Connections
Iso Omena can be reached by all buses travelling along Länsiväylä past Matinkylä, and by buses passing over Piispansilta. Beginning from November 2017, the shopping centre can also be reached by the metro. The Matinkylä metro station is located directly under the southern part of Iso Omena.

References

External links
 

Shopping centres in Espoo